Copa flavoplumosa is a species of spider in the family Corinnidae, found in Africa.

References

Corinnidae
Spiders of Africa
Spiders described in 1886